OMN or omn may refer to:

 Oromia Media Network, an Oromo news channel headquartered in Minneapolis, Minnesota, United States
 OMN, the FAA LID code for Ormond Beach Municipal Airport, Florida, United States
 OMN, the IATA code for Osmanabad Airport, Maharashtra, India
 omn, the ISO 639-3 code for Minoan language, Crete